Periodic short-interval diffuse discharges are a type of EEG abnormality with periodicity less than 4.0 seconds. They can consist of sharp waves or spikes, spike and wave, polyspikes or triphasics with background attenuation in between transients.

References

Electroencephalography
Neuroscience